Bertram Burleigh (1890 – 1961) was a British actor of the silent era.

Selected filmography
 John Halifax, Gentleman (1915)
 The Mother of Dartmoor (1916)
 Trapped by the London Sharks (1916)
 Mrs. Thompson (1919)
 Garryowen (1920)
 The Black Spider (1920)
 How Kitchener Was Betrayed (1921)
 All Roads Lead to Calvary (1921)
 Open Country (1922)
 Squibs Wins the Calcutta Sweep (1922)
 Becket (1923)
 Man and His Kingdom (1922)

References

External links
 

1890 births
1961 deaths
English male film actors
English male silent film actors
Male actors from London
20th-century English male actors